Sugita is a Japanese surname. Notable people with the surname include:

, Japanese women's footballer
, Japanese poet
Kaoru Sugita (born 1964), Japanese actress, singer, and celebrity
, Japanese basketball player
, Japanese Paralympic swimmer
Mio Sugita, (born 1967), Japanese politician
Motoshi Sugita (born 1951), Japanese politician of the Liberal Democratic Party
Sugita Genpaku (1733–1817), Japanese scholar who was known for his translation of Kaitai Shinsho (New Book of Anatomy)
, Japanese sport shooter
Tomokazu Sugita (born 1980), Japanese voice actor
Yūichi Sugita (born 1988), Japanese tennis player
Yukiya Sugita (born 1993), Japanese footballer

See also
Sugita Station (Kanagawa), located in Isogo Ward, Yokohama, Japan
Shin-Sugita Station, located in Isogo Ward, Yokohama, Japan
Project Sugita Genpaku, project that aims to translate free content texts into Japanese

Japanese-language surnames